Wheldrake railway station served the village of Wheldrake, East Riding of Yorkshire, England from 1913 to 1968 on the Derwent Valley Light Railway.

History 
The station opened on 21 July 1913 on the Derwent Valley Light Railway. Just to the west was a goods yard. The station closed to passengers on 1 September 1926
 and to freight in 1968. The station building was dismantled and rebuilt in Murton Park in 1997.

References

External links 

Railway stations in Great Britain opened in 1912
Railway stations in Great Britain closed in 1926
1912 establishments in England
1968 disestablishments in England